This is a list of state forests in the U.S. state of Vermont. Vermont state forests are managed by the Vermont Department of Forests, Parks and Recreation.

List of state forests in Vermont

Map of state forests in Vermont

See also

 List of Vermont state parks
 List of Vermont natural areas

External links

 Vermont Department of Forests, Parks and Recreation State Forests

State forests
Vermont state forests